Zainal Arifin (born 1 April 1982 in Jakarta) is an Indonesian professional footballer who plays as a midfielder for Liga 3 club Persipa Pati.

Honours

Club
Persijap Jepara
 Liga 3: 2019

References

External links
 Zainal Arifin at Soccerway
 Zainal Arifin at Liga Indonesia

1982 births
Association football midfielders
Living people
Indonesian footballers
Liga 1 (Indonesia) players
Persela Lamongan players
Persijap Jepara players
Indonesian Premier Division players
Persib Bandung players
Sportspeople from Jakarta